Star is a 2021 Indian Malayalam-language film directed by Domin D'Silva, written by Suvin S. Somasekharan and produced by Abraham Mathew under the banner of Abaam Movies. The film stars Joju George, Sheelu Abraham, Jaffar Idukki and Prithviraj Sukumaran in a cameo appearance.  

The film was released worldwide on 29 October 2021 to mostly negative reviews.

Plot
The film is about a couple, Roy and Ardra, married for 17 years and living happily with their four children. Their life turns upside down once Ardra starts behaving very strangely all of a sudden.

Cast
 Joju George as Roy 
 Sheelu Abraham as Ardra 
 Prithviraj Sukumaran as Dr. Derrick (cameo appearance)
 Jaffar Idukki
 Subbalakshmi
 Baby Sreelakshmi
 Gayathri Ashok
 Rajesh B.
 Tanmay Mithun Madhavan
 Saniya Babu
 Sarasa Balusherry
 Shiny Sarah
 Sabhita Calicut

Music
The music of the film is composed by M. Jayachandran and Ranjin Raj.

Release
The film was originally planned to release on 9 April 2021, but was postponed due to second wave of COVID-19 pandemic in India. The film was released theatrically on 29 October 2021.

References

External links

2021 films
2020s Malayalam-language films
Films about mental health
Films postponed due to the COVID-19 pandemic